The Borujerdi House is a historic house museum in Kashan, Iran. It was built in 1857 by architect Ustad Ali Maryam for the bride of Borujerdi, a wealthy merchant. The bride came from the affluent Tabātabāei family, for whom the architect had built the nearby Tabātabāei House several years earlier.

Structure
The Borujerdi House consists of the biruni ("exterior", the public area) and andaruni ("interior", the private quarters) features of Iran's traditional residential architecture, including a courtyard with a fountain pool and a two-story iwan (balcony). The main hall is topped by a khishkhan, that is a type of central dome. Three 40-meter-tall windcatchers, two above the main hall and one over the entrance area, are also erected on the house. The house is decorated with stucco, glass work, and mirror work, and features frescoes by prominent painter Kamal-ol-Molk.

Gallery

References

Historic house museums in Iran
Buildings and structures in Kashan
Tourist attractions in Kashan
Houses completed in 1857
1857 establishments in Iran
Borujerdi House